Richard C. Vinci (born 1947) is a retired United States Navy rear admiral. He served as the 35th Chief of the United States Navy Dental Corps. He retired in July 2011, after 42 years of naval service. Admiral Vinci is a member of the International College of Dentists, Academy of Operative Dentistry, American Dental Association, American Board of Operative Dentistry, and the American College of Dentists.

Enlisted career and education
Born in Chicago, Vinci enlisted in the United States Navy in 1968 as a dental technician. After completing his first tour of duty at Marine Corps Air Station New River, he would be honorably discharged as a petty officer second class.

Vinci attended William Carey University where he was a member of the university's Chi Beta Phi chapter. He graduated in 1973 with a bachelor's degree in chemistry. From there, he enrolled in the Louisiana State University School of Dentistry, graduating in 1977 with a D.D.S.

Officer career

After graduating, Vinci accepted a commission as a lieutenant in the United States Navy Dental Corps. He completed several tours as a junior officer, and was selected for advanced training at the University of Michigan, graduating with a master's in restorative dentistry in 1985. Following that, he became board certified in February 1990.

After several executive officer and commanding officer tours, Vinci was promoted to rear admiral (lower half), and appointed the 35th Chief of the United States Navy Dental Corps in 2007. While serving as the Corps' chief, in 2008 he was also selected to be a member of the American Dental Education Association's House of Delegates. 

Vinci passed the office of Chief of the Navy Dental Corps to Admiral Elaine C. Wagner in 2010, and retired from the United States Navy in July 2011.

After retirement
Vinci continued to be involved in dental organizations after his retirement from the Navy, including serving as the president of the Academy of Operative Dentistry, and as a regent at-large for the American College of Dentists.

Honors, awards, and decorations
In addition to his military awards and honors, Vinci was inducted into the Carey University Alumni Hall of Fame in 2011 and was recognized as one of Louisiana State University's alumni of the year in 2017.

Notes
: The ADEA House of Delegates is the organization's rule and policy making body.

References

External links
 
 Richard C. Vinci in the journal of Military Medicine
 Details from Richard C. Vinci's National Provider Identifier.

1947 births
Living people
Missing middle or first names
Military personnel from Chicago
William Carey University alumni
Louisiana State University alumni
American dentists
20th-century American naval officers
University of Michigan School of Dentistry alumni
21st-century American naval officers
Recipients of the Meritorious Service Medal (United States)
Recipients of the Legion of Merit
United States Navy rear admirals (lower half)